The 1980 Gaware Paints Bombay International was a professional invitational snooker tournament held in February 1980 in Bombay (modern-day Mumbai), India.

In a slight tweak to the previous season, eight professionals played in a round-robin format of three matches each. Four players progressed to the knockout stages, with John Virgo winning the tournament by defeating Cliff Thorburn 13–7 in the final.

Main draw

Round-robin

Knockout stage

References

1980 in snooker
1980 in Indian sport
February 1980 sports events in Asia
Snooker in India